The Geological Survey of Austria (GBA) in Vienna is a subordinate agency of the Federal Ministry of Education, Science and Research and is the central point for information and advice in the field of earth sciences for the Republic of Austria. The most important product of the GBA is a range of geological maps. These appear in various scales both as map series and as regional maps. They form the basis for responses to questions in many areas of business (waste disposal, water supply, transportation, raw materials, geothermal energy …) and also for research. The GBA is located in the district of Landstraße in Vienna.

Sources 
 Geologische Bundesanstalt (Hrsg.): Die Geologische Bundesanstalt in Wien. Böhlau-Verlag, Wien 1999. 
 Hans Georg Krenmayr (Red.): ROCKY AUSTRIA - Eine bunte Erdgeschichte von Österreich. Wien 2002. 
 Thomas Hofmann, Hans P. Schönlaub  (Hrsg.): Geo-Atlas Österreich. Die Vielfalt des geologischen Untergrunds.  1. Auflage, Böhlau, 2008.  (Übersicht über geowissenschaftliche Kartierungen Österreichs, Projekt der  Geologischen Bundesanstalt)

External links 
 www.geologie.ac.at - Official web site

Geological surveys
National geological agencies
Organisations based in Vienna
Buildings and structures in Landstraße